Short Cut to Hell is a 1957 American film noir, filmed in black-and-white VistaVision, starring Robert Ivers and Georgann Johnson. The film is the only directorial effort by famous actor James Cagney.

Short Cut to Hell is a remake of the 1941 Alan Ladd film This Gun for Hire, which in turn was based on the 1936 Graham Greene novel A Gun for Sale.

Plot
Professional hitman Kyle Niles (Ivers) is hired to commit two murders and afterwards double-crossed by his employer Bahrwell (Aubuchon). Seeking revenge, Kyle kidnaps singer Glory Hamilton (Johnson), the girlfriend of the police detective in charge of his pursuit (Bishop). Kyle is finally able to get even with Bahrwell, and in the process reveals his long-dormant "good" side.

Cast 
 Robert Ivers as Kyle Niles
 Georgann Johnson as Glory Hamilton 
 William Bishop as Sgt. Stan Lowery 
 Jacques Aubuchon as Bahrwell 
 Peter Baldwin as Carl Adams 
 Yvette Vickers as Daisy 
 Murvyn Vye as Nichols
 Richard Hale as AT

See also
 List of American films of 1957

References

External links
 
 
 
 

1957 films
1957 crime films
American crime films
American black-and-white films
Film noir
Films based on works by Graham Greene
Remakes of American films
Paramount Pictures films
1950s English-language films
1950s American films